This is a list of years in Fiji.

16th century

17th century

18th century

19th century

20th century

21st century

See also
List of years by country

Years in Fiji
History of Fiji
Fiji-related lists